From Day to Day is a 1990 studio album by American jazz pianist Mulgrew Miller recorded together with drummer Kenny Washington and bassist Robert Hurst. This is his seventh album as a leader.

Reception

Jack Fuller of Chicago Tribune noted "The piano jazz of Mulgrew Miller is altogether serviceable. He is quick with the unusual scale, graceful on the ballads. Here with only a bass and drums behind him, he has a chance to show his skill. The trouble, at least for me, is that I can`t hear his voice. He is still generic, which is a shame, because he just may have something to say".

Track listing

Personnel
Band
Robert Hurst – bass
Mulgrew Miller – piano
Kenny Washington – drums

Production
Paul Goodman – engineer
Orrin Keepnews – producer

References

1990 albums
Landmark Records albums
Albums produced by Orrin Keepnews
Mulgrew Miller albums